The 2018 City of Playford Tennis International was a professional tennis tournament played on hard courts. It was the first edition of the tournament which was part of the 2018 ATP Challenger Tour and the 2018 ITF Women's Circuit. It took place in Playford, Australia between 1 and 7 January 2018.

Men's singles main-draw entrants

Seeds

 1 Rankings are as of 25 December 2017.

Other entrants
The following players received wildcards into the singles main draw:
  Omar Jasika
  Marc Polmans
  Alexei Popyrin
  Max Purcell

The following players received entry from the qualifying draw:
  Maverick Banes
  Hugo Grenier
  Jason Kubler
  Marinko Matosevic

Women's singles main-draw entrants

Seeds

 1 Rankings are as of 25 December 2017.

Other entrants
The following players received wildcards into the singles main draw:
  Michaela Haet
  Kaylah McPhee
  Ivana Popovic
  Alexandra Walters

The following players received entry from the qualifying draw:
  Alison Bai
  Alexandra Bozovic
  Misa Eguchi
  Jennifer Elie
  Anna-Lena Friedsam
  Allie Kiick
  Marta Kostyuk
  Belinda Woolcock

Champions

Men's singles

 Jason Kubler def.  Brayden Schnur, 6–4, 6–2

Women's singles
 Zoe Hives def.  Alexandra Bozovic, 6–4, 5–7, 7–6(7–4)

Men's doubles

 Mackenzie McDonald /  Tommy Paul def.  Maverick Banes /  Jason Kubler, 7–6(7–4), 6–4.

Women's doubles
 Dalila Jakupović /  Irina Khromacheva def.  Junri Namigata /  Erika Sema, 2–6, 7–5, [10–5]

External links
 2018 City of Playford Tennis International at ITFtennis.com
 Official website

2018 ATP Challenger Tour
2018 ITF Women's Circuit
2018 in Australian tennis